Asuncion (Spanish: Asunción, meaning "Ascension") is a former stage coach stop. All that remains of a building are a few bits of adobe rubble. A spring runs through it from the other side of the road, Traffic Way. It is thought that  Juan Batista De Anza and his party of settlers may have camped near here on their trek north. The adobe building or ruins of it were destroyed by a former owner of the farm who saw it as a potential 
liability. There never was a "community" here and today most people don't know the spot exists. It lies within the incorporated City of Atascadero, CA. in San Luis Obispo County, California, United States. Asuncion is located along U.S. Route 101 between Templeton and Atascadero.

References

Unincorporated communities in San Luis Obispo County, California
Unincorporated communities in California